The Motorway 21 (A21) is a road under construction. Starts from node-Ferron Ardanio at A2 (Egnatia Odos) and leads the Greek-Bulgarian border Ormenio. The work undertaken by the Egnatia Odos SA In constructed part (77 km in length) consists of:
A stream of traffic per sector
one emergency lane (LEA)
double line traffic in the center of the road
The section of the Old National Road (51) consists of:
one class per traffic stream double line

21
Roads in Eastern Macedonia and Thrace